Ultimate Fight Night 2 was a mixed martial arts event held by the Ultimate Fighting Championship on October 3, 2005. The event took place at the Hard Rock Hotel and Casino in Las Vegas, Nevada, and was broadcast live on Spike TV in the United States and Canada.  The broadcast drew a 1.6 overall rating while going head-to-head with USA Network's WWE Raw in a heated ratings battle. 

This event also marked the first UFC appearance of Thiago Alves, Jon Fitch, Brandon Vera, Spencer Fisher and Brock Larson.



Results

See also 
 Ultimate Fighting Championship
 List of UFC champions
 List of UFC events
 2005 in UFC

External links
A Detailed Look at the WWE vs. UFC Ratings Showdown [fully details the ratings for Ultimate Fight Night 2]

UFC Fight Night
2005 in mixed martial arts
Mixed martial arts in Las Vegas
2005 in sports in Nevada
Hard Rock Hotel and Casino (Las Vegas)